Judith Wright (1915–2000) was an Australian poet, environmentalist and campaigner for Aboriginal land rights.

Judith Wright may also refer to:

 Judith Wright (artist) (born 1945), Australian painter, videomaker, sculptor, printmaker
 Judith Sewell Wright, American author, speaker, lifestyles expert and life coach
 Judy Wright (born 1956), Canadian former swimmer

See also
Judith Wright Award (disambiguation)